The Geoncheonri Formation is an Early Cretaceous (Aptian-Albian) geologic formation of the Hayang Group in the Gyeongsang Basin of southeast South Korea. Fossil ornithopod tracks, as well as fossils of Kirgizemys have been reported from the lacustrine siltstones and mudstones of the formation.

Description 
The Geoncheonri Formation (ca.  thick) is the uppermost formation of the Hayang Group, belonging to the Gyeongsang Supergroup. The Gyeongsang Supergroup is widely distributed in the southeastern part of the Korean Peninsula, mainly within the Gyeongsang Basin, which is the largest sedimentary basin of South Korea. It is divided into the Shindong and Hayang Groups, consisting mainly of thick siliciclastic sequences of alluvial, fluvial and lacustrine sediments, and the Yucheon Group, characterized by the dominance of volcanic rocks.

The Hayang Group consists of Chilgok, Silla, Hakbong, Haman, Banyawol, Songnaedong, Chaeyaksan and Geoncheonri Formations in ascending order. The Geoncheonri Formation is conformably underlain by the Chaeyaksan Formation and overlain by the Jusasan Formation, the lowermost of the Yucheon Group.

Since plant fossils were first reported in the Geoncheonri Formation in 1925, a series of paleontological studies has been made with molluscs, spores and pollen, charophytes, and dinosaur footprints. Plant fossils from the Geoncheonri Formation were correlated with the Monobegawa Group and the Gyliak Series (Lower to "Middle" Cretaceous) in Japan. Yang (1978) noted that the co-occurrence of a pelecypod Trigonioides paucisulcatus in the Geonchonri Formation and in the Gyliakian Goshonoura Group (Cenomanian to Turonian) of Japan. However, primitive angiosperm pollen (Retimonocolpites peroreticulatus and Tricolpites sp.) and other palynological features suggest that the age of the Geoncheonri Formation is Aptian to Albian. The charophytes from the Geoncheonri Formation also indicate an Aptian to Albian age.

Fossil content 
The following fossils were reported from the formation:
 Turtles
 Kirgizemys cf. exaratus
 Ichnofossils
 Ornithopoda indet.
 Theropoda indet.

See also 
 List of dinosaur-bearing rock formations
 List of stratigraphic units with ornithischian tracks
 Ornithopod tracks
 Gugyedong Formation
 Haman Formation
 Hasandong Formation
 Jinju Formation
 Sagog Formation

References

Bibliography 

 
  
 

Geologic formations of South Korea
Lower Cretaceous Series of Asia
Cretaceous South Korea
Albian Stage
Mudstone formations
Siltstone formations
Lacustrine deposits
Ichnofossiliferous formations
Paleontology in South Korea